The N5 is a Bangladeshi national highway connecting the capital Dhaka and the town of Banglabandha on the Bangladesh-India border.

Junction list

References

National Highways in Bangladesh